Gerhard Müller (born 10 May 1929) is a German Lutheran theologian. He served as Landesbischof of the Evangelical Lutheran Church in Brunswick between 1982 and 1994.

Life
Müller was born on 10 May 1929 in Marburg. He studied evangelical theology at the University of Marburg, University of Göttingen and the University of Tübingen. Müller was professor of historical theology at the University of Erlangen–Nuremberg for 15 years, from 1967 to 1982. He was editor of the Theologische Realenzyklopädie.

He became Landesbischof of the Evangelical Lutheran Church in Brunswick on 1 October 1982 and served until 31 May 1994. From 1990 to 1993 he also served as Leading Bishop (German: Leitender Bischof) of the United Evangelical Lutheran Church of Germany.

Müller was elected a foreign member of the Royal Netherlands Academy of Arts and Sciences in 1979. He is a member of the Akademie der Wissenschaften und der Literatur. Müller received an honorary doctorate from the University of St Andrews in 1980.

References

1929 births
Living people
20th-century German Lutheran bishops
20th-century German Protestant theologians
German Lutheran theologians
Historians of Christianity
Members of the Royal Netherlands Academy of Arts and Sciences
People from Marburg
Academic staff of the University of Erlangen-Nuremberg